Yoon So-hee (born May 7, 1993) is a South Korean actress.

Early life and education
Yoon was born in Stuttgart, Germany, on May 7, 1993, and lived there for six years before returning to Seoul. In 2011, she enrolled as a Chemical and Biomolecular Engineering major at KAIST, one of South Korea's prestigious science and research universities; she is currently on a leave of absence. Later, in 2021, she returned to study.

Career
Yoon was first featured on Hit the S Style, a variety show which spotlights campus style icons which was aired on tvN. She then appeared in the intermission video at Super Show 5, a concert tour by Super Junior, followed by an uncredited cameo in the music video for SHINee's "Why So Serious?".

In 2013, she starred in music videos by EXO in EXO Music Video Drama (in both Korean and Mandarin Chinese versions). Afterwards, Yoon made her acting debut in the period drama The Blade and Petal. She has since been cast in increasingly larger roles in television dramas such as Let's Eat (2013) and Secret Door (2014), where she acted as the older version Kim Yoo-jung's character.

Yoon had her film debut in the romance film Salut d'Amour (2015) as the younger version of Youn Yuh-jung's character, followed by a supporting role in the South Korean-Chinese film Life Risking Romance (2016). In 2016, she had her first leading role in KBS' mini drama The Day After We Broke Up alongside Kim Myung-soo.

Yoon gained increased recognition following her supporting role in the sageuk The Emperor: Owner of the Mask. In 2018, Yoon portrayed her first lead role in the romantic comedy drama Witch's Love.

In October 2022, Yoon signed with new agency Saram Entertainment.

Filmography

Film

Television series

Web series

Television shows

Hosting

Music video appearances

Ambassadorship 
 Hall of Science honorary ambassador (2022)

Awards and nominations

References

External links
 
 

1993 births
Living people
South Korean television actresses
South Korean film actresses
South Korean web series actresses
KAIST alumni
Actresses from Stuttgart
South Korean female models